Cabinet of Curiosities is a compilation album by English post-punk band The Pop Group, released on 20 October 2014 through Freaks R Us.

Track listing

Personnel 
The Pop Group
 Dan Catsis – bass guitar
 Gareth Sager – saxophone, clarinet, piano, organ, guitar, mastering
 Bruce Smith – drums, percussion
 Mark Stewart – vocals
 Simon Underwood – bass guitar
 John Waddington – guitar, bass guitar

Technical
Bill Aitken – engineering
Mike Coles – cover art
Nick Watson – mastering
Tony Wilson – producer

Release history

References

External links 
 
 Cabinet of Curiosities at Bandcamp

2014 compilation albums
The Pop Group albums